Alan Conrad Bovik  (born June 25, 1958) is an American engineer, vision scientist, and educator. He is a professor at the University of Texas at Austin (UT-Austin), where he holds the Cockrell Family Regents Endowed Chair in the Cockrell School of Engineering and is Director of the Laboratory for Image and Video Engineering (LIVE). He is a faculty member in the UT-Austin Department of Electrical and Computer Engineering, the Machine Learning Laboratory, the Institute for Neuroscience, and the Wireless Networking and Communications Group.

Bovik received a Primetime Emmy Award in 2015 for his development of perception-based video quality measurement tools that are now standards in television production. He also received a Technology and Engineering Emmy Award in 2021 for the “development of perceptual metrics for video encoding optimization.”

Work
Al Bovik was educated at the University of Illinois at Urbana–Champaign (PhD 1984). He has made numerous fundamental contributions to the fields of digital photography, digital television, digital image processing, digital video processing, digital cinema, and computational visual perception. He is particularly well known for his work on low-level vision, natural scene modeling, image quality, and video quality.

He has published more than 900 articles and books in these areas. He is also the author/editor of The Handbook of Image and Video Processing (Academic Press, 2nd edition, 2005), with Zhou Wang of Modern Image Quality Assessment (Morgan and Claypool, 2006), and the author/editor of the companion books The Essential Guide to Image Processing and The Essential Guide to Video Processing (Academic Press, 2009). Overall, his work has been cited in the scientific and engineering literature more than 140,000 times according to Google Scholar. He is one of the most highly cited engineers in the world according to the Web of Science.

Professor Bovik is an elected member of the United States National Academy of Engineering, and an elected Fellow of the National Academy of Inventors. He is also a Fellow of the IEEE, The Optical Society, the Society of Photo-Optical and Instrumentation Engineers (SPIE), an Honorary Fellow of the Royal Photographic Society (HonFRPS) and an Honorary Member of the Society for Imaging Science and Technology (IS&T). He is a voting member of the Academy of Television Arts and Sciences (Television Academy) and was named an inaugural member of its Science and Technology Peer Group. He was named a Distinguished Alumnus of the University of Illinois at Urbana–Champaign in 2008.

Bovik is credited with the development of order statistic filters, the image modulation model, computational modeling of visual texture perception, theories of foveated image processing, and for widely used and disseminated image quality and video quality computational models and measurement tools that are used throughout the television, cinematic, streaming video, and social media industries. His contributions include the invention or co-invention of the Emmy Award-winning Structural Similarity (SSIM) video quality measurement tool, the MOVIE Index, the Visual Information Fidelity (VIF) algorithms, and his extensive contributions to the Emmy Award-winning VMAF system, all reference models that predict human perception of image quality or distortion; the RRED indices, which are a family of reduced reference image and video quality prediction models, and BRISQUE, BLIINDS, DIIVINE and NIQE, which are a new breed of image and video quality prediction models that produce accurate predictions of human judgments of picture quality without the benefit of any reference information. His picture and video quality models SSIM, MS-SSIM, VIF, VMAF, MOVIE, BRISQUE, and NIQE currently process a significant percentage of all bits transmitted both in the United States as well as globally, and are implemented in commercial cable, satellite, broadcast, streaming video, television, home cinema / disc, and social media quality monitoring and control workflows around the world.

Service to the profession
He served as the founder and First General Chair of the IEEE International Conference on Image Processing (ICIP). He also co-founded (with David Munson, Jr.) the IEEE Transactions on Image Processing and was its longest-serving Editor-in-Chief, with a tenure of six years.

Educational activities
Bovik's academic legacy includes serving as the supervising professor of more than 60 PhD graduates, more than 50 master's degree recipients, and more than two dozen post-doctoral researchers.

He has created widely used, adopted, and cited books and online courseware, including The Handbook of Image and Video Processing (Academic Press, 2000, 2005), Modern Image Quality Assessment (Morgan & Claypool, 2006), The Essential Guide to Image Processing (Academic Press, 2009), and The Essential Guide to Video Processing (Elsevier Academic Press, 2009). His award-winning online courseware is used internationally: SIVA – Courseware for Signal, Image, Video and Audio Processing. This online courseware offers broad, deep online curricula for digital image and video processing and digital signal processing. SIVA includes hundreds of signal, image and video processing demonstrations delivering live, interactive audio-visual experiences of signal and image processing algorithms.

Awards
Bovik has received a number of major international awards. These include:

 A BaM (“Bammy”) Award from the International Trade Association for Broadcast and Media (IABM) in December 2022 “for perceptual picture quality algorithms and databases for streaming and social media." BaM Awards are given to “any product that is recognized by the judging panel is not just an innovative solution but is genuinely important to the market and sets the standard in its category.” 
 The Edison Medal from the Institute of Electrical and Electronics Engineers (IEEE) in May 2022 "for pioneering high-impact scientific and engineering contributions leading to the perceptually optimized global streaming and sharing of visual media.”
 A Technology and Engineering Emmy Award from the National Academy of Television Arts and Sciences  (NATAS) in October 2021 for the “development of perceptual metrics for video encoding optimization.”
 The Progress Medal from the Royal Photographic Society (RPS) in November 2019 "in recognition of any invention, research, publication or other contribution which has resulted in an important advance in the scientific or technological development of photography or imaging in the widest sense." Bovik was also named an Honorary Fellow of RPS (HonFRPS).
 The IEEE Fourier Award in 2019 “For seminal contributions and high-impact innovations to the theory and application of perception-based image and video processing.”
 The Edwin H. Land Medal from The Optical Society of America in 2017 “For substantially shaping the direction and advancement of modern perceptual image quality theory, and for energetically engaging industry to transform his ideas into global practice.”
 A Primetime Emmy Award (Primetime Emmy Engineering Award) for Outstanding Achievement in Engineering Development from the Academy of Television Arts and Sciences (The Television Academy) in October 2015 for his work on video quality prediction technology.
 The Norbert Wiener Society Award from the IEEE Signal Processing Society in 2013, “For fundamental contributions to digital image processing theory, technology, leadership and education.”

In addition he has been recognized by the following honors:

 1997: Leo L. Beranek Meritorious Service Award of the IEEE Signal Processing Society
 2000: IEEE Third Millennium Medal
 2005: Claude Shannon-Harry Nyquist Technical Achievement Award of the IEEE Signal Processing Society 
 2007: Carl Friedrich Gauss Education Award of the IEEE Signal Processing Society
 2008: Distinguished Alumnus Award, University of Illinois at Urbana-Champaign
 2009: IEEE Signal Processing Society Best Paper Award
 2009: The University of Texas at Austin Hocott Distinguished Centennial Engineering Research Award
 2010: IS&T/SPIE Imaging Scientist of the Year
 2012: SPIE Technology Achievement Award
 2013: IEEE Signal Processing Magazine Best Paper Award
 2013: IEEE Signal Processing Society Young Author Best Paper Award (co-author)
 2013: IS&T Honorary Member Award
 2016: IEEE Circuits and Systems for Video Technology Best Paper Award
 2016: The University of Texas at Austin Joe J. King Professional Engineering Achievement Award
 2017: Google Scholar Classic Paper in the area Signal Processing
 2017: Google Scholar Classic Paper in the area Computer Vision & Pattern Recognition
 2017: IEEE Signal Processing Letters Best Paper Award
 2017: IEEE Signal Processing Society Sustained Impact Paper Award
 2018: EURASIP Best Paper Award
 2019: IEEE ICIP Pioneer Award, “For unparalleled leadership and contributions to the image processing community.”
 2020: EURASIP Best Paper Award
 2020: The University of Texas at Austin Career Research Excellence Award

References

1958 births
Living people
21st-century American engineers
University of Illinois Urbana-Champaign alumni
University of Texas at Austin faculty
People from Kirkwood, Missouri
Primetime Emmy Engineering Award winners